The 1997–98 BBL season was known as the Budweiser League for sponsorship reasons. The league featured the same 13 teams as the previous year, playing 36 games each. The only change saw the Hemel Royals renamed the Watford Royals.

Greater London Leopards clinched their second successive Budweiser League title only by virtue of an overtime win in their final game of the season against Sheffield Sharks. Leopards' 102–106 victory in Sheffield meant they finished level on points with title-rivals Birmingham Bullets, but were crowned Champions due to a better head-to-head record over the Midlands team. Birmingham gained some consolation by taking their second Play-off Championship in three years at Wembley Arena, beating off a tough challenge from Thames Valley Tigers, winning 78–75. The Thames Valley Tigers won the National Cup and the Sheffield claimed their first uni-ball Trophy with an 82–79 win over London Towers at the National Exhibition Centre.

London Towers represented the Budweiser League in European competition, participating in the EuroCup.

Notable occurrences 
 Greater London Leopards won the League title in the final game of the season on April 5, 1998, with a 102–106 overtime victory at Sheffield Sharks. Regulation time ended on 90–90, but Leopards' Eric Burks sunk 9 of their 16 overtime points to win the title for the second successive season.

Budweiser League Championship (Tier 1)

Final standings

The play-offs

Quarter-finals 
(1) Greater London Leopards vs. (8) Manchester Giants

(2) Birmingham Bullets vs. (7) Derby Storm

(3) Newcastle Eagles vs. (6) London Towers

(4) Sheffield Sharks vs. (5) Thames Valley Tigers

Semi-finals

Third-place game

Final

National League Division 1 (Tier 2)

Final standings

Playoffs
Semi-finals

Final

National League Division 2 (Tier 3)

Final standings

Playoffs
Semi-finals

Final

Sainsbury's Classic Cola National Cup

Fourth round

Quarter-finals

Semi-finals

Final

uni-ball Trophy

Group stage 
Northern Group
Southern Group

Sheffield finished ahead of Chester and Derby by having the best record in matches between the three teams and qualify as fourth-placed finishers with the best record ahead of Watford on basket difference. London Towers received a bye into Quarter-finals.

Quarter-finals 
Greater London Leopards vs. Thames Valley Tigers

London Towers vs. Manchester Giants

Newcastle Eagles vs. Birmingham Bullets

Sheffield Sharks vs. Leicester Riders

Semi-finals 
London Towers vs. Newcastle Eagles

Sheffield Sharks vs. Greater London Leopards

Final

Dairylea Dunkers All-Star Game

Statistics leaders

Seasonal awards 

 Most Valuable Player: Eric Burks (Greater London Leopards)
 Coach of the Year: Billy Mimms (Greater London Leopards)
 All-Star Team:
 Eric Burks (Greater London Leopards)
 John Amaechi (Sheffield Sharks)
 Ted Berry (Derby Storm)
 Tony Dorsey (Birmingham Bullets)
 Tony Holley (Thames Valley Tigers)
 Danny Lewis (London Towers)
 Nigel Lloyd (Birmingham Bullets)
 John McCord (Thames Valley Tigers)
 Leon McGee (Newcastle Eagles)
 John White (Greater London Leopards)

References 

British Basketball League seasons
1
British